Thorbjørn Damgaard (7 July 1891 – 12 December 1980) was a Norwegian footballer. He played in one match for the Norway national football team in 1912.

References

External links
 
 

1891 births
1980 deaths
Norwegian footballers
Norway international footballers
Footballers from Oslo
Association football midfielders
Frigg Oslo FK players